The treaty of Bruges of 1375 (also known as the truce of Bruges) was a truce between the Kingdoms of England and France during the Hundred Years' War. It was signed on 27 June 1375 for one year, then extended on 12 March 1376   to 24 June 1377. King Charles V of France retained the territories conquered during his previous military operations. The Duchy of Brittany is returned to France, with the exception of Brest, Auray and Berval which remain the possessions of John IV of Brittany.

Background 
The second phase of the Hundred Years' War gave advantage to the French. In total, between 1369 and 1375, King of France Charles V took back almost all the territories lost before 1369 and even land owned by the English before the start of the war, with the exceptions of Calais, Cherbourg, Brest, Bordeaux, Bayonne, and some fortresses in the Massif Central. But at this point, Charles V knew he could not regain more ground, the inhabitants of the Bordeaux region being inclined to support the English because of their commercial ties (they exported their wine on a massive scale to England). Since his strategy was based on winning back hearts before that of territories, he did not want to encumber himself with cities ready to rebel at the first opportunity. The road was thus open to negotiate in Bruges a treaty ending the war by recognizing the sovereignty of the French over the reconquered territories.

The scene 
Bruges and its cloth industry dependent on wool imports from across the Channel, was a pro-English city in the French territory. Its ease of access for the English made it a neutral ground favorable for negotiations. Philip the Bold, Duke of Burgundy, son-in-law and heir of the Count of Flanders Louis de Male, was the negotiator for the French. He was assisted by a team of advisers sent by Charles V: the bishop of Amiens Jean de La Grange, Hugues de Châtillon, lord of Dampierre and Roullamcourt and Master of Crossbowmen, the count of Tancarville (Bertrand Du Guesclin), the count of Saarbrücken Jean IV of Saarbrücken-Commercy, Arnaud de Corbie (the first president of the Parlement), Bureau de La Rivière, Johan Harlaston, Johan Shepeye doctor in law, Enguerran Dendiu lord of Chastiamullan, and Nicolas du Bosc. On the English side the Duke of Lancaster John of Gaunt represented Edward III.

The negotiations 
Philip, Duke of Burgundy, first hosted sumptuous banquets and games, then the first negotiating session began on March 25, 1375 in the church of Saint-Donatien in Bruges. It resulted in two plans for the partition of Gascony, which the duke, after consulting his council, rejected on the grounds that these partition plans would result in the recognition of the sovereignty of England over part of the French territory. Under the influence of Pope Gregory XI, the belligerents signed a truce on July 1, 1375, which lasted until June 1377.  

The second session was again held in Bruges between the end of December 1375 and the end of March 1376. The papal legate, in order to get around the thorny problem of sovereignty, proposed a 40-year truce, refused by both parties: the English because Brittany was occupied by the troops of Charles V and the French because they wanted to include Castile in the treaty in order to secure the throne of King Henry II after John of Gaunt advanced his own claims to Castile. 

The third session opened in July 1376, this time conducted by advisers to the kings. Charles V proposed to recognize the sovereignty of Edward III over the lands of Gascony located to the south of the Dordogne, to return Agenais, Bigorre, Quercy, Bazadais to him and to pay him the 1,200,000 francs still due from the ransom of John II of France in exchange for Calais and on the condition that this new duchy of Gascony remains in the territory of the kingdom of France (he did not consent to any surrender of sovereignty). This implies that Edward III as the Duke of Gascony must pay homage to him, that all legal judgements can be called into question by the Court of Paris and that the duchy could possibly be confiscated. It was on this occasion that the bishop of Chartres  developed a thesis that gradually became accepted: the king could not alienate the rights of the crown; the inalienable character of sovereignty is sacred. Edward III refused the proposed terms and died on June 21, 1377. Hostilities resumed.

Notes

References 

Treaties of the Hundred Years' War
1375 in Europe
1370s in England
Bruges
Treaties of medieval England
Treaties of the Kingdom of France
History of Bruges
1370s in France